Tania Sorrell  (born 6 March 1947) is an Australian infectious disease physician who is a Professor and Director of the Marie Bashir Institute for Infectious Diseases and Biosecurity at the University of Sydney. She serves as Chair of the National Health and Medical Research Council Research Translation Faculty Steering Group on New and Emerging Health Threats. She is interested in the diagnosis, prevention and treatment of infectious diseases.

Early life and education 
Sorrell studied medicine at the University of Adelaide. She earned her undergraduate and graduate degrees in Adelaide, where she studied anticonvulsant drugs in immunosuppression. She moved to the University of California, first supported by a Fulbright-Hays award and then as a postdoctoral fellow.

Research and career 
Sorrell studies the pathogenesis of invasive fungal infections, drug discovery and translational research. She joined the faculty at the University of Sydney in 1985. She has focused her career on the fungi Cryptococcus. She has studied the virulence determinants in Cryptococcus neoformans in an effort to identify novel treatments and rapid diagnostics tests. These treatments include new classes of antifungals. She has designed a novel PCR platform for the rapid screening of DNA and RNA from up to 70 micro-organisms at the same time, which can speed up clinical diagnostics. Beyond Cryptococcus, Sorrell is interested in the emergence of resistant microorganisms.

Sorrell helped to establish the University of Sydney's Marie Bashir Institute for Infectious Diseases and Biosecurity.

Awards and honours 
Sorrell served as President of the Australasian Society for Infectious Diseases in 1989. She is senior advisor for the Global Action Fund for Fungal Infections. She was awarded a Member of the Order of Australia in 2014. She is a Fellow of the Australian Academy of Health and Medical Sciences.

Selected publications

References 

Australian women medical doctors
Australian medical doctors
1947 births
Living people
Members of the Order of Australia
University of Adelaide alumni
Academic staff of the University of Sydney
Fellows of the Australian Academy of Health and Medical Sciences